Harry Septimus Freeman (11 June 1860 – 7 November 1933) was an Australian cricketer. He played four first-class cricket matches for Victoria between 1887 and 1889 and three for Queensland between 1893 and 1895.

See also
 List of Victoria first-class cricketers

References

External links
 

1860 births
1933 deaths
Australian cricketers
Victoria cricketers
Queensland cricketers
Cricketers from Melbourne